Fort Hamilton Parkway is a parkway in Brooklyn, New York.

Fort Hamilton Parkway also refers to the following stations on the aforementioned road:

Fort Hamilton Parkway (IND Culver Line), serving the  trains
Fort Hamilton Parkway (BMT Culver Line), now demolished
Fort Hamilton Parkway (BMT West End Line), serving the  train
Fort Hamilton Parkway (BMT Sea Beach Line), serving the  train